Ismet Nderim Sinani (born 31 May 1999) is a Kosovan footballer who plays as a forward for Serie D club Legnago. He also represented Albania internationally at youth level before switching his allegiance to Kosovo.

Early life
Sinani was born in Belluno, Italy to Kosovo Albanian parents from Celine.

He holds Kosovan, Albanian and Italian passports. From an early age he dreamed of being a football player, and in just a few years he went from the fields of Belluno to Milan. At 16, he signed his first professional contract for three years and then renewed it for three more until 2021. He relaunched at US Levico Terme to return after just one season in the professional ranks at Virtus Verona.

Club career

AC Milan
In 2013, Sinani joined the youth team of AC Milan and he played for their under-19 squad, beginning in the 2015–16 season.

Loan to Juve Stabia
On 31 August 2018, Sinani joined Serie C side Juve Stabia, on a season-long loan. On 30 September 2018, he made his debut in a 1–3 away win against Paganese after coming on as a substitute at 77th minute in place of Salvatore Elia.

Loan to Sicula Leonzio
At the start of the 2019–20 season, Sinani was loaned out to Serie C side Sicula Leonzio with an option to make the deal permanent.

Virtus Verona
After two seasons in Serie D, in June 2022 Sinani returned to Serie C at Virtus Verona. On 27 January 2023, Sinani's contract with Virtus Verona was terminated by mutual consent.

Legnago
On 28 January 2023, Sinani moved to Serie D club Legnago.

International career

Albania

Under-17
On 6 April 2015, Sinani was named as part of the Albania U17 squad for 2015 Tournament of Nations, which was held in Gradisca d'Isonzo, Italy from 24 April–2 May 2015. On 25 April 2015, he made his debut with Albania U17 in a match against Mexico U15 after being named in the starting line-up.

2016 UEFA European Under-17 Championship qualifications
On 22 October 2015, Sinani made his debut with Albania U17 in a 2016 UEFA European Under-17 Championship qualification match against Switzerland U17 after being named in the starting line-up.

Kosovo

Under-19
On 17 March 2018, Sinani was named as part of the Kosovo U19 squad for 2018 UEFA European Under-19 Championship elite qualifications. On 21 March 2018, he made his debut with Kosovo U19 in a match against Portugal U19 after coming on as a substitute at 53rd minute in place of Lirim Kastrati.

Career statistics

Club

References

External links

Ismet Sinani at the Albanian Football Association

1999 births
People from Belluno
Sportspeople from the Province of Belluno
Footballers from Veneto
Living people
Kosovan footballers
Kosovo youth international footballers
Albanian footballers
Albania youth international footballers
Italian footballers
Italian people of Kosovan descent
Italian people of Albanian descent
Association football forwards
Serie C players
Serie D players
S.S. Juve Stabia players
A.S.D. Sicula Leonzio players
Virtus Verona players
F.C. Legnago Salus players